The PLZ-07 or Type 07 is a Chinese 122 mm self-propelled artillery made by the China North Industries Group Corporation (NORINCO). The PLZ-07 self-propelled howitzer was first unveiled to the public during the military parade celebrating 60th anniversary of the PLA on 1 October 2009. The PLZ-07 was developed to replace the older Type 89, Type 85 and Type 70/70-1 122 mm self-propelled artillery systems.

Design and development
PLZ-07 largely retained the design language of PLZ-89, the previous self-propelled howitzer developed by Norinco. The new chassis for PLZ-07 self-propelled artillery is developed from ZBD-04 infantry fighting vehicles, featuring improved armor protection, fire suppression system, and NBC protection. The vehicle is 6.66 m long, 3.28 m wide and 2.5 m high to the turret roof. It carries a crew of five and its 440 kW (600 hp) diesel engine gives it a top road speed of 65 km/h and a maximum road range of 500 km.

The PLZ07 122 mm tracked self-propelled gun mounts a PL-96 122 mm/L32 howitzer. The design of the PL-96 could be based on Soviet D30 howitzer. The vehicle weighs 22.5 tons fully loaded and carries 40 rounds of ammunition. The gun has a maximum range of 18 km with normal ammunition, 22 km with base bleed and 27 km with rocket assisted rounds. The gun has an elevation from 0° to +70° and a maximum rate of fire of 6–8 rounds per minute. In addition to the 122 mm howitzer, the QJC-88  heavy machine gun is mounted on the turret roof, and there are two triple banks of 76 mm smoke grenade dischargers on either side of the turret.

The PLZ-07 is land based while the PLZ-07B is the amphibious variant that shares a common design with modification derived from the ZBD-05.

Variants
PLZ-07 Land based variant.
PLZ-07B amphibious variant with unique dedicated-designed amphibious chassis. Although this vehicle is part of the PLZ-07 series, the vehicle hull shares design elements from ZBD-05 amphibious fighting vehicle

Operators

People's Liberation Army Ground Force - 700 units as of 2021. 550 units of PLZ-07A; 150 units of PLZ-07B.
People's Liberation Army Navy Marine Corps - 20+ units of PLZ-07B

See also 
 List of equipment of the People's Liberation Army Ground Force
Related development
 Type 70 SPH - 122 mm self-propelled howitzer developed by China in 1960s.
 Type 85 SPH - 122 mm self-propelled howitzer developed by China in 1980s.
 PLZ-89 - previous generation of self-propelled howitzer system developed by China.
Comparable ground systems
 2S1 Gvozdika

Notes

External links
PLZ-07 122mm Self-propelled tracked howitzer armoured vehicle

122 mm artillery
Tracked self-propelled howitzers
Self-propelled artillery of the People's Republic of China